Dombasle-sur-Meurthe (literally Dombasle on Meurthe) is a commune in the Meurthe-et-Moselle department in north-eastern France, close to the city of Nancy.

History
Dombasle is one of the main production sites for sodium carbonate in the world, as Solvay created there in 1873 one of its oldest production plants. This sodium bicarbonate production plant is a key economic actor in Nancy region. The remains of the castle were destroyed in 1963.

Population

See also
 Communes of the Meurthe-et-Moselle department

Gallery

References

Dombaslesurmeurthe